California State Christian University is an unaccredited and unregulated school based in Los Angeles, California. Founded in 1972 by a Korean pastor, the school focuses on religious studies and programs.

Due to unregulation of the institution and dubious programs, numerous changes to base locations in the last decade, it is considered as a diploma mill.

Noted alumni

 Canadian Senator Don Meredith

References

Unaccredited institutions of higher learning in the United States
Educational institutions established in 1972
1972 establishments in California